They Call It Love is a 1953 West German comedy film directed by John Reinhardt and starring Winnie Markus, Curd Jürgens and Richard Häussler. It was shot at the Bavaria Studios in Munich. The film's sets were designed by the art director Ludwig Reiber.

Cast

References

Bibliography 
 Bock, Hans-Michael & Bergfelder, Tim. The Concise CineGraph. Encyclopedia of German Cinema. Berghahn Books, 2009.

External links 
 

1953 films
1953 comedy films
German comedy films
West German films
1950s German-language films
Films directed by John Reinhardt
German black-and-white films
1950s German films
Films shot at Bavaria Studios